The Boguko River is a stream located in Sibagat, Agusan del Sur, Caraga Region, Philippines. It is a tributary of the larger Wawa River with headwaters located in the mountain boundaries of Sibagat and the Province of Surigao del Sur.

Etymology

The Boguko River got its name from the native word bagako, which means "mysterious". According to oral history from early inhabitants of the place, mostly manobo natives, the place where the river is located had made few stories of mysterious disappearance of people and animals, which is why they called the place Bagako River. Variant forms and spelling of Bagako or in other native languages exist such as Bagoko and its present name Boguko.

Geography

The Boguko River is situated approximately 8.779840, 125.711982 in the island of Mindanao. Terrain elevation at these coordinates is estimated 719 metres above sea level.

The Boguko River headwaters originate from the Diwata Mountain Range of Barangays Banagbanag and New Tubigon where its mouth located in Barangay Magsaysay joins with the larger Wawa River. The Wawa River is the largest and longest river in the town and a tributary river to the Agusan River.

Crossings 
In early years, a logging company operating on that area constructed an access road and built a highly elevated detour bridge that crossed the Boguko River and they named it "Boguko Bridge". The bridge connects the villages of Sitio San Roque of Barangay Magsaysay to Sitio Kahayag of Barangay Banagbanag. The said access road and bridge are now part of the Butuan–Kolambugan–Tandag Road.

See also

Agusan River
Wawa River (Agusan del Sur)
Andanan River
Sibagat River
Sibagat, Agusan del Sur
Agusan del Sur Province
List of rivers of the Philippines

References

Rivers of the Philippines
Landforms of Agusan del Sur